Arthur Robert Oliver (born 1829/30) was a New Zealand politician and a 19th-century Member of Parliament from Nelson, New Zealand.

He was born in London, the son of Thomas Oliver. He was admitted to Wadham College, Oxford in 1848, aged 18. He subsequently emigrated to New Zealand.

In 1882 he took a B.A. and M.A. from St Mary Hall, Oxford.

References

Members of the New Zealand House of Representatives
Year of death missing
New Zealand MPs for South Island electorates
19th-century New Zealand politicians
Year of birth uncertain